Gravel Hill is an unincorporated community in Center Township, Benton County, in the U.S. state of Indiana.

History
The name of the community is descriptive of a local hill made of gravel.

Geography

References

Unincorporated communities in Indiana
Unincorporated communities in Benton County, Indiana